Naganakulam is a panchayat town in Madurai district in the Indian state of Tamil Nadu.

Demographics
 India census, Naganakulam had a population of 17,579. Males constitute 51% of the population and females 49%. Naganakulam has an average literacy rate of 80%, higher than the national average of 59.5%: male literacy is 83%, and female literacy is 77%. In Naganakulam, 7% of the population is under 6 years of age.naganakulam came under corporation in 2008 and it is not a panchayat town.

Politics
It is part of the Madurai (Lok Sabha constituency). S. Venkatesan also known as  Su. Venkatesan from CPI(M) is the Member of Parliament, Lok Sabha, after his election in the 2019 Indian general election.

References

Cities and towns in Madurai district